Adnan Oçelli (born 6 August 1963) is an Albanian retired international football player, used mostly as a left defender.

Club career
He grew up at the KF Partizani football academy and defended its red colors for 9 years, until he moved abroad and joined Croatian side NK Zadar in 1993. In 1995–1996 he had a short spell with Union Berlin and he later played in South Korea and in Croatia again.

International career
Oçelli made his debut for Albania in the famous December 1984 FIFA World Cup qualification win over Belgium and earned a total of 11 caps, scoring no goals. His final international was a June 1993 FIFA World Cup qualification match against Denmark.

Player agent
Oçelli spent time as a coach with Croatian amateurs Podgradina and later became one of Albania's official FIFA player agents.

Honours
Albanian Superliga: 2
 1987, 1993

References

External sources
 
 
 Profile at Playerhistory.

1963 births
Living people
Association football fullbacks
Albanian footballers
Albania international footballers
FK Partizani Tirana players
NK Zadar players
1. FC Union Berlin players
HNK Orijent players
Suwon Samsung Bluewings players
NK Hrvatski Dragovoljac players
Albanian expatriate footballers
Expatriate footballers in Croatia
Expatriate footballers in Germany
Expatriate footballers in South Korea
K League 1 players
Albanian expatriate sportspeople in Croatia
Albanian expatriate sportspeople in Germany
Albanian expatriate sportspeople in South Korea